Multiracial people are people of more than one race. A variety of terms have been used both historically and presently for mixed race people in a variety of contexts, including multiethnic, polyethnic, occasionally bi-ethnic, Métis, Muwallad, Colored, Dougla, half-caste, ʻafakasi, mestizo, mutt, Melungeon, quadroon, octoroon, sambo/zambo, Eurasian, hapa, hāfu, Garifuna, pardo, and Guran. A number of these terms are now considered offensive, in addition to those that were initially coined for pejorative use.

Individuals of mixed-race backgrounds make up a significant portion of the population in many parts of the world. In North America, studies have found that the mixed race population is continuing to grow. In many countries of Latin America, mestizos make up the majority of the population and in some others also mulattoes. In the Caribbean, mixed race people officially make up the majority of the population in the Dominican Republic (73%), Aruba (68%), and Cuba (51%).

Definitions
While defining race is controversial, race remains a commonly used term for classification, often related to visible physical characteristics or known community. In so far as race is defined differently in different cultures, perceptions of mixed race are subjective.

According to U.S. sociologist Troy Duster and ethicist Pilar Ossorio:

In the United States:

Related terms
In the English-speaking world, many terms for mixed race people exist, some of which are pejorative or are no longer used. Mulato, zambo and mestizo are used in Spanish, mulato, caboclo, cafuzo, ainoko (from Japanese) and mestiço in Portuguese, and mulâtre and métis in French. These terms are also in certain contexts used in the English-speaking world. In Canada, the Métis are a recognized ethnic group of mixed European and Indigenous American descent, who have status in the law similar to that of First Nations.

Terms such as mulatto for people of partially African descent and mestizo for people of partially Native American descent are still used by English-speaking people of the Western Hemisphere but mostly to refer to the past or to the demography of Latin America and its diasporic population. Half-breed is a historic term that referred to people of partial Native American ancestry; it is now considered pejorative and discouraged from use. Mestee, once widely used, is now used mostly for members of historically mixed-race groups, such as Louisiana Creoles, Melungeons, Redbones, Brass Ankles and Mayles.

In South Africa and much of English-speaking southern Africa, the term Coloured was used to describe both mixed-race persons of African and European descent, and those Asians not of African descent. While the term is socially accepted, it is becoming outdated because of its association with the apartheid era.

In Latin America, populations became triracial after the introduction of African slavery. A panoply of terms developed during the Spanish and Portuguese colonial periods, including terms such as zambo for persons of Amerindian and African descent. Charts and diagrams intended to explain the classifications were common. The well-known Casta paintings in Mexico and, to some extent, Peru, were illustrations of the different classifications.

At one time, Latin American census categories have used such classifications. In Brazilian censuses since the Imperial times, for example, most persons of mixed heritage, except Asian Brazilians with some European descent (or any other to the extent it is not clearly perceptible) and vice versa, tend to be thrown into the single category of "pardo". But racial boundaries in Brazil are related less to ancestry than to phenotype. A westernized Amerindian with copper-colored skin may also be classified as a "pardo", a caboclo in this case, despite not being mixed race. A European-looking person, even with one or more African or Indigenous ancestors, is not classified as "pardo" but as "branco", a white Brazilian. The same applies to "negros", Afro-Brazilians whose European or Amerindian ancestors are not visible in their appearance. According to genetic research, most Brazilians of all racial groups (except Asian-Brazilians and natives) are, to some extent, mixed-race.

In English, the terms miscegenation and amalgamation were used for unions between whites, blacks, and other ethnic groups. Those terms are now often considered offensive and are becoming obsolete. The terms mixed-race, biracial or multiracial are becoming generally accepted. In other languages, terms for miscegenation are not necessarily considered offensive.

Regions with significant mixed race populations

Africa
In East Africa, specifically Uganda, Kenya and Tanzania (including portions of the East African Community), people of mixed race are called half-castes (in English) or chotara (singular, in Swahili), wachotara (plural in Swahili).

North Africa

In North Africa, numerous mixed race communities can be found, reflecting a history of both extensive Mediterranean trade around the region and later colonization and migration by African groups. Among these are the Haratin, oasis-dwellers of Saharan southern Morocco, Algeria, and Mauritania. They are believed to be an ethnicity composed of Sub-Saharan Africans and Berber ancestry. They constitute a socially and ethnically distinct group.

For centuries Arab slave traders sold sub-Saharan Africans as slaves in cumulatively large numbers throughout the Persian Gulf, Anatolia, Central Asia and the Arab world. Communities descended from these slaves and local peoples can be found throughout these regions. Barbary pirates were known to attack European and British ships and take Europeans into slavery as well. So many were taken, that the memoirs of survivors are considered a literary genre known as captivity narratives. When English and other European colonists were taken captive by Native Americans, they had models for recounting their trials.

According to a recent genetic study in 2019, North African populations are composed of admixture of extensive gene flow from four different geographical regions (North Africa  (Iberomaurusian), Europe, West Asia, and Sub-Saharan Africa) and temporal sources (Palaeolithic migrations, Neolithization, Arabization, and recent migrations).

Madagascar

Almost the entire population of Madagascar is an about equal admixture of South East Asian (Indonesian), primarily from Borneo, and Bantu-speaking settlers primarily from the mainland at Mozambique. Years of intermarriages created the Malagasy people, who primarily speak Malagasy, an Austronesian language with Bantu influences.

South Africa

In South Africa, the Prohibition of Mixed Marriages Act of 1949 prohibited marriage between Whites (people of European descent) and non-Whites (being classified as Black, Asian and Coloured). But this followed centuries of interaction and unions resulting in mixed race children. This law was repealed in 1985.

Mixed race South Africans are commonly referred to as Coloureds. According to the 2016 South African Census, they are the second-largest ethnic group (8.8%), behind Black Africans, or Bantu peoples, who constitute (80.8%) of the current population. White South Africans make up 8.1%.

Asia

Central Asia

Today, many Central Asian populations are an amalgamation of various peoples such as Mongols, Turkics, and Iranians. The Mongol invasion of Central Asia in 13th century resulted in the massacre of the population of Iranians and other Indo-European peoples, as well as a large degree of unions and assimilation. Genetic studies shows that Central Asian Turkic people and Hazara are a mixture of Northeast Asians and Indo-European people. Caucasian ancestry is prevalent in almost all central Asian Turkic people. Kazakhs, Hazara, Karakalpaks, Crimean Tatars have more European MtDNA than European Y-DNA. Kyrgyz have mostly European Y-DNA, with substantial European MtDNA. Other Turkic people, such as Uyghurs and Uzbeks, have mostly European Y-DNA but also a significantly higher percentage of European MtDNA. Turkmen have predominantly European DNA in both paternal and maternal lines.

India
Henry Louis Vivian Derozio, a radical thinker and educator, was of Indian and European background. 
Prior to colonization, the peoples of India had a long history of trade and other interaction with other peoples. More recently a Eurasian mix developed during the Colonial period, beginning with the French, Dutch, Portuguese and other European traders and merchants, including British. Such interaction continued during the British Rule in India, although it lessened as British families settled in the country. The estimated population of Anglo-Indians, the term for these Eurasians, is 600,000 worldwide, with the majority living in India and the UK.

Article 366(2) of the Indian Constitution defines Anglo-Indian as: (2) an Anglo-Indian means a person whose father or any of whose other male progenitors in the male line is or was of European descent but who is domiciled within the territory of India and is or was born within such territory of parents habitually resident therein and not established there for temporary purposes only;

Goans are an assimilation of Indo-Aryan, Eurasian, and Luso-Asian ancestries. Many have Portuguese ancestors, as they had considerable influence in Goa for over 450 years. Many Goans have traced family trees to find Portuguese ancestors from hundreds of years ago. Some Goans today identify as Portuguese-Goan as they have much Portuguese ancestry and Portuguese surnames.

Myanmar (Burma)
Myanmar (formerly Burma) was a British colony from 1826 until 1948. Other European nationals were active in the country before the British arrived. Intermarriage and relationships took place among such settlers and merchants with the local Burmese population, and subsequently between British colonists and the Burmese. The local Eurasian population is known as the Anglo-Burmese. This group dominated colonial society and through the early years of independence. After Burma gained independence in 1948, many Anglo-Burmese left the country; the diaspora resides primarily in Australia, New Zealand and the UK. An estimated 52,000 Anglo-Burmese live in Burma.

Philippines

The Philippines was a Spanish colony for almost four centuries, or 333 years. The United States took it over after the Spanish-American War, ruling for 46 years. Many Filipinos are of mixed Spanish Filipino and Philippine-American descent.

After the defeat of Spain during the Spanish–American War in 1898, the Philippines and other remaining Spanish colonies were ceded to the United States in the Treaty of Paris. The Philippines was under U.S. sovereignty until 1946, though occupied by Japan during World War II. In 1946, in the Treaty of Manila, the U.S. recognized the Republic of the Philippines as an independent nation. Even after 1946, the U.S. maintained a strong  military presence in the Philippines, with as many as 21 U.S. military bases and 100,000 U.S. military personnel stationed there as defense in Asia and during the Vietnam War.

After the bases closed in 1992, American troops left, often abandoning partners and their Amerasian children. The Pearl S. Buck International foundation estimates there are 52,000 Amerasians in the Philippines, with 5,000 in the Clark area of Angeles City. An academic research paper presented in 2012 in the U.S. by an Angeles, Pampanga, Philippines Amerasian college research study unit suggests that the number could be much higher.

In the United States, intermarriage between Filipinos and other ethnicities is common. They have the highest number of interracial marriages among Asian immigrant groups, as documented in California. Some 21.8% of Philippine-Americans are of mixed ancestry.

Singapore and Malaysia
According to government statistics, the population of Singapore as of September 2007 was 4.68 million. Mixed race people, including Chindians and Eurasians, formed 2.4%.

In Singapore and Malaysia, the majority of inter-ethnic marriages are between Chinese and Indians. The offspring of such marriages are informally known as "Chindian". The Malaysian government classifies them only by their father's ethnicity. As the majority of these intermarriages usually involve an Indian groom and Chinese bride, the majority of Chindians in Malaysia are usually classified as "Indian" by the government. As for the Malays, who are predominantly Muslim, legal restrictions in Malaysia make it uncommon for them to intermarry with either the Indians, who are predominantly Hindu, or the Chinese, who are predominantly Buddhist and Taoist. But Indian Muslims and Arabs in Singapore and Malaysia often take local Malay wives, because of their common Islamic faith.

The Chitty people, in Singapore and the Malacca state of Malaysia, are Tamils with considerable Malay ancestry. The early Tamil settlers took local wives, as they had not brought their own women at that time.

In the East Malaysian states of Sabah and Sarawak, intermarriage has been common between Chinese and native tribespeople, such as the Murut and Dusun in Sabah, and the Iban and Bisaya in Sarawak. A mixture of cultures has resulted in both states. The offspring of these marriages are called "Sino-(name of tribe)", e.g. Sino-Dusun. Normally, children are strongly affected by the father's ethnicity and culture, being raised in his culture. These Sino-natives usually become fluent in both Malay and English. A smaller number are able to speak Chinese dialects and Mandarin, especially those who have received education in vernacular Chinese schools.

Sri Lanka
Due to its strategic location in the Indian Ocean, the island of Sri Lanka has been a confluence for settlers from various parts of the world. There are several mixed-race ethnicities in the Island. The most notable mixed-race group are the Sri Lankan Moors, who trace their ancestry to Arab traders who settled on the island and intermarried with local women. Today, the Sri Lankan Moors live primarily in urban communities. They preserve Arab-Islamic cultural heritage while adopting many Southern Asian customs.

The Burghers are a Eurasian ethnic group. They are descendants through paternal lines of European colonists from the 16th to 20th centuries (mostly Portuguese, Dutch, German and British) and with maternal ancestry among local women. Other European minorities in such admixtures include Swedish, Norwegian, French and Irish.

The Sri Lanka Kaffirs are an ethnic group partially descended from 16th-century Portuguese traders and their enslaved Africans. The Kaffirs spoke a distinctive creole based on Portuguese, the Sri Lanka Kaffir language, which is now extinct. Their cultural heritage includes the dance styles Kaffringna and Manja, as well as the Portuguese Sinhalese, Creole, Afro-Sinhalese varieties.

Taiwan
During the 1662 Siege of Fort Zeelandia in which Chinese Ming loyalist forces commanded by Koxinga besieged and defeated the Dutch East India Company and conquered Taiwan, the Chinese took Dutch women and child prisoners. The Dutch missionary Antonius Hambroek, two of his daughters, and his wife were among the Dutch prisoners of war with Koxinga. Koxinga sent Hambroek to Fort Zeelandia demanding Hambroek persuade them to surrender or else he would be killed when he returned. Hambroek returned to the Fort where two of his other daughters were. He urged the Fort not to surrender, and returned to Koxinga's camp. He was then executed by decapitation. In addition to this, a rumor was spreading among the Chinese that the Dutch were encouraging native Taiwan aboriginals to kill the Chinese, so Koxinga ordered the mass execution of Dutch male prisoners in retaliation, in addition to a few women and children also being killed. The surviving Dutch women and children were then turned into slaves. Koxinga took Hambroek's teenage daughter as a concubine, and Dutch women were sold to Chinese soldiers to become their wives. The daily journal of the Dutch fort recorded that  "the best were preserved for the use of the commanders, and then sold to the common soldiers. Happy was she that fell to the lot of an unmarried man, being thereby freed from vexations by the Chinese women, who are very jealous of their husbands." In 1684 some of these Dutch wives were still captives of the Chinese.

Some Dutch physical traits like auburn and red hair among people in regions of south Taiwan are a consequence of this episode of Dutch women becoming concubines to the Chinese commanders. The Chinese took Dutch women as slave concubines and wives who were never freed: in 1684 some were reported to be living. In Quemoy a Dutch merchant was contacted with an arrangement to release the prisoners, proposed by a son of Koxinga's, but it came to nothing. The Chinese officers used the Dutch women they received as concubines. The Dutch women were used for sexual pleasure by Koxinga's commanders. This event of Dutch women being distributed to the Chinese soldiers and commanders was recorded in the daily journal of the fort.

A teenage daughter of the Dutch missionary Anthonius Hambroek became a concubine to Koxinga. She was described by the Dutch commander Caeuw as "a very sweet and pleasing maiden".

Dutch language accounts record this incident of Chinese taking Dutch women as concubines and the date of Hambroek's daughter.

Vietnam
Under terms of the Geneva Accords of 1954, departing French troops took thousands of Vietnamese wives and children with them after the First Indochina War. Some Eurasians stayed in Vietnam, after independence from French rule.

China

West Asia

Ottoman slave traders sold slaves in cumulatively large numbers over the centuries throughout the Persian Gulf, Anatolia, Central Asia and the Arab world and communities descended from these slaves can be found throughout these regions.

Europe

United Kingdom

In 1991 an analysis of the census showed that 50% of Black/Mixed Caribbean men born in the UK have white partners, and the 2011 BBC documentary Mixed Britannia noted that 1 in 10 British children are growing up in mixed households. 
 
In 2000, The Sunday Times reported that "Britain has the highest rate of interracial relationships in the world" and certainly the UK has the highest rate in the European Union. The 2001 census showed the population of England to be 1.4% mixed-race, compared with 2.7% in Canada and 1.4% in the U.S. (estimate from 2002), although this U.S. figure did not include mixed-race people who had a black parent. Both the US and UK have fewer people identifying as mixed race, however, than Canada.

In the United Kingdom, many mixed race people have Caribbean, African or Asian heritage. For example, supermodel Naomi Campbell, who has Jamaican, African and Asian roots. Some, like 2008 Formula One World Champion, Lewis Hamilton, are referred to or describe themselves as 'mixed'.

The 2001 UK Census included a section entitled 'Mixed' to which 1.4% (1.6% by 2005 estimates) of people responded, which was split further into White and Black Caribbean, White and Asian, White and Black African and Other Mixed. In the 2011 census, 2.2% chose 'Mixed' for the question on ethnicity.

North America

Canada

Mixed race Canadians in 2006 officially totaled 1.5% of the population, up from 1.2% in 2001. The official mixed race population grew by 25% since the previous census. Of these, the most frequent combinations were multiple visible minorities (for example, people of mixed black and South Asian heritage form the majority, specifically in Toronto), followed closely by white-black, white-Chinese, white-Arab and many other smaller mixes.

During the time of slavery in the United States, a very large but unknown number of African American slaves escaped to Canada, where slavery was made illegal in 1834, via the Underground Railroad. Many of these people married in with European Canadian and Native Canadian populations, although their precise numbers and the numbers of their descendants, are not known.

Another 1.2% of Canadians officially are Métis (descendants of a historical population who were partially Aboriginal—also called "Indian" or "Native"—and European, particularly English, Scottish, Irish and French ethnic groups). Although the term "Métis" stems from the Latin verb , "to mix", the Métis people are a distinct ethnic group within Canada.

United States

In the United States, the 2000 census was the first in the history of the country to offer respondents the option of identifying themselves as belonging to more than one race. This mixed race option was considered a necessary adaptation to the demographic and cultural changes that the United States has been experiencing.

Mixed race Americans officially numbered 6.1 million in 2006, or 2.0% of the population. There is considerable evidence that an accurate number would be much higher. Prior to the mid-20th century, many people hid their mixed race heritage. The development of binary thinking about race meant that African Americans, a high proportion of whom have also had European ancestry, were classified as black. Some are now reclaiming additional ancestries. Many Americans today are multi-racial without knowing it. According to the Census Bureau, as of 2002, 75% of all African Americans had mixed ancestries usually European and Native American.

In 2010, the number of Americans who checked both "black" and "white" on their census forms was 134 percent higher than it had been a decade earlier. In 2012, those choosing 'Two or more races' on the census was 2.4% of the total.

According to James P. Allen and Eugene Turner, by some calculations in the 2000 Census, the mixed race population that is part white is as follows:
White/Native American and Alaskan Native: 7,015,017
White/African American: 737,492
White/Asian: 727,197 and
White/Native Hawaiian and other Pacific Islander: 125,628.

The stigma of a mixed race heritage, associated with racial discrimination among numerous racial groups, has decreased significantly in the United States. People of mixed-race heritage can identify themselves now in the U.S. Census by any combination of races, whereas before Americans were required to select from only one category. For example, in 2010, they were offered choices of one or more racial categories from the following list:

White
Black, African Am. or Negro
American Indian or Alaska Native
Asian Indian

Chinese
Filipino
Japanese
Korean
Vietnamese

Native Hawaiian
Guamanian or Chamorro
Samoan

Other Asian [specify]
Other Pacific Islander [specify]
Some Other Race [specify]

The US has a growing mixed race identity movement, reflective of a desire by people to claim their full identities. Interracial marriage, most notably between whites and blacks, was historically deemed immoral and illegal in most states in the 18th, 19th and first half of the 20th century because of  its long association of blacks with the slave caste. California and the Western United States had similar laws to prohibit European-Asian marriages, which was associated with discrimination against Chinese and Japanese on the West Coast. Many states eventually repealed such laws and a 1967 decision by the US Supreme Court (Loving v. Virginia) overturned all remaining US anti-miscegenation laws.

The United States is one of the most racially diverse countries in the world. Americans are mostly mixed ethnic descendants of various immigrant nationalities culturally distinct in their former countries. Assimilation and integration took place, unevenly at different periods of history, depending on the American region. The "Americanization" of foreign ethnic groups and the inter-racial diversity of millions of Americans has been a fundamental part of its history, especially on frontiers where different groups of people came together.

On January 20, 2009, Barack Obama was sworn in as America's first mixed race president, as he is the son of a European American mother and a Luo father from Kenya. He acknowledges both parents. His official White House biography describes him as African American. In Hawai'i, the U.S. state in which he was born, he would be called "hapa", which is the Hawaiian word for "mixed race".

Oceania

Fiji
Fiji has long been a multi-ethnic country, with a vast majority of people being mixed race even if they do not self-identify in that manner. The indigenous Fijians are of mixed Melanesian and Polynesian ancestry, resulting from years of migration of islanders from various places mixing with each other. Fiji Islanders from the Lau group have intermarried with Tongans and other Polynesians over the years. The overwhelming majority of the rest of the indigenous Fijians, though, can be genetically traced to having mixed Polynesian/Melanesian ancestry.

The Indo-Fijian population is also a hodge-podge of South Asian immigrants (called Girmits in Fiji), who came as indentured labourers beginning in 1879. While a few of these labourers managed to bring wives, many of them either took or were given wives once they arrived in Fiji. The Girmits, who are classified as simply "Indians" to this day, came from many parts of the Indian subcontinent of present-day India, Pakistan and to a lesser degree Bangladesh and Myanmar. It is easy to recognize the Indian mixtures present in Fiji and see obvious traces of Southern and Northern Indians and other groups who have been categorised together. To some degree, even more of this phenomenon would have likely happened if the religious groups represented (primarily Hindu, Muslim and Sikh) had not resisted to some degree marriage between religious groups, which tended to be from more similar parts of the Indian subcontinent.

Over the years, particularly in the sugar cane-growing regions of Western Viti Levu and parts of Vanua Levu, Indo-Fijians and Indigenous Fijians have mixed. Others have Chinese/Fijian ancestry, Indo-Fijian/Samoan or Rotuman ancestry and European/Fijian ancestry (often called "part Fijians"). The latter are often descendants of shipwrecked sailors and settlers who came during the colonial period. Migration from a dozen or more different Pacific countries (Tuvalu, Solomon Islands, Vanuatu, Samoa and Wallis and Futuna being the most prevalent) have added to the various ethnicities and intermarriages.

Latin America and the Caribbean

Mestizo is the common word used to describe mixed race people in Latin America, especially people with Native American and Spanish or other European ancestry. Mestizos make up a large portion of Latin Americans, comprising a majority in many countries.

In Latin America, racial mixture was officially acknowledged from colonial times. There was official nomenclature for every conceivable mixture present in the various countries. Initially, this classification was used as a type of caste system, where rights and privileges were accorded depending on one's official racial classification. Official caste distinctions were abolished in many countries of the Spanish-speaking Americas as they became independent of Spain. Several terms have remained in common usage.

Race and racial mixture have played a significant role in the politics of many Latin American countries. In most countries, for example Mexico, Puerto Rico, Dominican Republic and Panama, a majority of the population can be described as biracial or mixed race (depending on the country). In Mexico, over 80% of the population is mestizo in some degree or another.

The Mexican philosopher and educator José Vasconcelos authored an essay on the subject, La Raza Cósmica, celebrating racial mixture. Venezuelan ex-president Hugo Chávez, himself of Spanish, indigenous and African ancestry, made positive references to the mixed race ancestry of most Latin Americans from time to time.

Colonialism throughout the West Indies has created diverse populations on many islands, including people of mixed race identities. Of note is the mixture of West African communities, most brought to the region as slaves and East Indian settlers most of whom came as indentured labor after the abolition of slavery. Trinidad and Tobago, Guyana and Suriname claim the highest populations of such mixtures, known locally as douglas. In addition to such mixtures, many inhabitants of the West Indies can also have any combination of Amerindian, Latino, European, Chinese, Arab and Jewish heritage.

Brazil

According to the 2010 official census, 43.13% of Brazilians identified themselves as pardo skin color. That option is normally marked by people that consider themselves mixed race (mestiço). The Mixed Race Day or Mestizo Day (Dia do Mestiço), on 27 June, is official event in States of Amazonas, Roraima e Paraíba and a holiday in two cities. The term pardo is formally used in the official census but is not used by the population. In Brazilian society, most people who are mixed race call themselves moreno: light-moreno or dark-moreno. Those terms are not considered offensive and focus more on skin color than on ethnicity (it is considered more like other human characteristics such as being short or tall).

The most common mixed race groups are between European and African (mulatto) and Amerindian and European (caboclo or mameluco). But there are also African and Amerindian (cafuzo) and East Asian (mostly Japanese) and European/other (ainoko or more recently, hāfu). All groups are more or less found throughout the whole country. Brazilian mixed race people with the following three origins, Amerindian, European and African, make up the majority. It is said today that 89% or even more of the "Pardo" population in Brazil has at least one Amerindian ancestor (most of brancos or White Brazilian population have some Amerindian or African ancestry too despite nearly half of the country's population self-labeling as "Caucasian" in the censuses. In Brazil, it is very common for mixed race people to claim that they have no Amerindian ancestry, but studies have found that if a Brazilian mixed race people can trace their ancestry back to nearly eight to nine generations, they will have at least one Amerindian ancestor from their maternal side of the family.

Since mixed race relations in Brazilian society have occurred for many generations, some people find it difficult to trace their own ethnic ancestry. Today a majority of mixed-race Brazilians do not really know their ethnic ancestry. Their unique features make them Brazilian-looking in skin color, lips and nose shape or hair texture, but they are aware only that their ancestors were probably Portuguese, African or Amerindian. Also, there was a very large number of other Europeans (counted in the millions) who contributed to the Brazilian racial make up, Japanese (the largest Japanese population outside Japan), Italian (the largest Italian population outside Italy) Lebanese (the largest population of Lebanese outside Lebanon), Germans, Poles and Russians. There is also a high percentage of Brazilians of Jewish descent, perhaps hundreds of thousands, mostly found in the northeast of the country who cannot be sure of their ancestry as they descend from the so-called "Crypto-Jews" (Jews who practiced Judaism in secret but outwardly pretended to be Catholics), also called Marranos or New Christians, often considered Portuguese. According to some sources, one third of families arrived from Portugal during colonization were of Jewish origin.

There is a high level of integration between all groups but also a great social and economic difference between European descendants (more common in upper and middle classes) and African, Amerindian and mixed race descendants (more common tin lower classes), which is called Brazilian apartheid.

See also

 Amalgamation (history)
 Interracial marriage
 Half-caste
 Melting pot
 Miscegenation
 Mixed Race Day
 Race (human classification)
 Race and genetics
 Multiethnic society
 One-drop rule
 Origins of Tutsi and Hutu
 Passing (racial identity)
 Plaçage
 Pre-Columbian trans-oceanic contact hypotheses
 Race and society
 Race traitor
 William Loren Katz
 Guran

Notes

References

External links

 The Multiracial Activist, an online activist publication registered with the Library of Congress, focused on multiracial individuals and interracial families since 1997
 ProjectRACE, an organization leading the movement for a multiracial classification

Advocacy groups
 Association of MultiEthnic Americans, Inc., US
 Blended People of America, US-based nonprofit organization representing the interests of the mixed-race community
 Brazilian Multiracial Movement, Brazilian mixed-race organization
 The Hafu Project, a study of half-Japanese people, London-, Munich-, Tokyo-based nonprofit organisation
 MAVIN Foundation, an organization advocating for mixed-heritage people and families
 Mixed Race UK , UK-based nonprofit organization representing the interests of the mixed-race community
 Mosaic UK, a UK-based organisation for mixed-race families
 People in Harmony UK
 Swirl, US-based mixed community

Multiracial affairs
Race (human categorization)